Debra Austin may refer to:

 Debra Austin (dancer) (born 1955), American ballet dancer
 Debra D. Austin, professor at Florida State University
 Debra Marshall, American actress and retired professional wrestling valet, and former wife of Steve Austin.

See also
 Debra Marshall (born 1960), American actress and professional wrestling valet, married Stone Cold Steve Austin